Cerros de Amotape National Park is a protected area located in the regions of Piura and Tumbes in northern Peru.

History 
The national park was officially established on July 22, 1975.

Geography 
Cerros de Amotape National Park is located in the provinces of Tumbes and Contralmirante Villar in the region of Tumbes and the province of Sullana in the region of Piura. The park has an elevational range between 120 m and 1538 m.

Climate
In the area, the rainy season spans from December to April, being the southern and western areas of the park the ones that receive less rain. Mean annual temperatures are in the range of 23° to 26 °C, with a mean annual precipitation of 500 mm in the tropical dry forest zone and 1450 mm in the Pacific tropical forest zone.

Ecology

The park protects a portion of the Tumbes–Piura dry forests ecoregion and the southern reaches of the Pacific Tropical Forest.

Flora 
Among the trees found in this area are: Ceiba trischistandra, Prosopis pallida, Albizia multiflora, Cedrela sp., Ziziphus thyrsiflora, Handroanthus billbergii, Handroanthus chrysanthus, Loxopterygium huasango, Bursera graveolens, etc.

Fauna 

Some of the mammals found in this area are: the red brocket, the Guayaquil squirrel, the neotropical otter, the white-tailed deer, the mantled howler, the white-fronted capuchin, the ocelot and the jaguar.

A total of 111 bird species have been registered in the park, some of them are: the grey-backed hawk, the grey-cheeked parakeet, the blackish-headed spinetail and the slaty becard.

The park is home to the endangered American crocodile.

Activities 
Hiking can be done in the park, especially in the buffer zone; there's the possibility to rent mules for longer routes inside the park. Canoeing can be done in the Tumbes river. Nature watching and research are other important activities in the park.

The park's checkpoints can be used as places to stay overnight.

At the zone of El Caucho, in the tropical forest zone, there are research facilities that can be visited.

Environmental issues 
The main threats to biodiversity inside the park are: livestock grazing, wood extraction (for construction and charcoal), extraction of honey from wild honeybees, hunting, overfishing in the Tumbes river, pollution of rivers, garbage left by tourists and introduction of exotic plant species.

References

External links 
 Cerros de Amotape National Park. Official site (in Spanish). 
 Cerros de Amotape National Park. Parkswatch.org

National parks of Peru
Protected areas established in 1975
Biosphere reserves of Peru
Geography of Piura Region
Geography of Tumbes Region
Tourist attractions in Piura Region
Tourist attractions in Tumbes Region